José-Alex Ikeng (born 30 January 1988) is a former professional footballer who played as a midfielder. Born in Cameroon, he represented Germany internationally.

Club career

VfB Stuttgart
Born in Bafia, Cameroon, Ikeng began his professional career in early 2005, signing with VfB Stuttgart's reserve side. At the time, Ikeng was one of the most highly touted young players in Germany, receiving third place for Fritz-Walter medal in 2006, an award given to the best young German footballer. (Ikeng finished behind Sergej Evljuskin and Alexander Eberlein of VfL Wolfsburg and 1860 Munich, respectively). However, following a series of knee injuries that threatened to end his career, Ikeng lost much of the interest he had begun to earn from senior clubs around Germany via lack of playing time in competitive games.

Werder Bremen
On 30 December 2008, Ikeng signed a contract with Werder Bremen that kept him at the club until the end of the 2010–11 season. He played for the Under-23 reserve team. In July 2009, in match against VfL Osnabrück, he sustained the third cruciate ligament tear of his career.

Later career
Ikeng joined Stuttgarter Kickers, placed last in the 3. Liga, from league rivals Hansa Rostock in January 2016. He signed a contract until summer 2017. He left the club at the end of his contract.

References

External links
 
 
 

1988 births
Living people
German footballers
Germany youth international footballers
Cameroonian footballers
Cameroonian emigrants to Germany
Naturalized citizens of Germany
Association football midfielders
German people of Cameroonian descent
2. Bundesliga players
3. Liga players
Regionalliga players
2. Liga (Austria) players
SpVgg Ludwigsburg players
VfB Stuttgart II players
SV Werder Bremen II players
SC Austria Lustenau players
FC Hansa Rostock players
Stuttgarter Kickers players